Toksun County is a county in Turpan Prefecture, Xinjiang Uyghur Autonomous Region, China.

Name
The term 'Toksun' means 'ninety'.

History
The Battle of Toksun took place in this county in July 1933 when Khoja Niyas Hajji, a Uighur leader, defected with his forces to Governor Sheng Shicai. He advanced to Toksun via Dawan Ch'eng, where the Chinese Muslim forces of General Ma Shih-ming achieved victory over Niyas Hajji's forces.

In December 2010, Zeng Lingquan, who ran an adoption agency for the physically and mentally disabled with no operation license in Sichuan, was arrested. Zeng reportedly sent the mentally ill to work in a factory run by Li Xinglin where they were enslaved and worked year round (instead of seasonally as with other local factories) in unsafe conditions at the Jia‘ersi Green Construction Material Chemical Factory in Kümüx.

In 2017, Radio Free Asia reported that a police officer in Toksun County had said that all Uyghurs who wished to travel abroad were required to attend political indoctrination education organized by the county government.

Geography and Climate
Toksun County's location in the bottom of the Turpan Depression and an average rainfall of just  annually, the least precipitation of any area in China, make it a very hot place during summertime.  The county is bordered to the south by Yuli County.

Administrative divisions
Towns ( / ):
Toksun Town (Tuokexun;  / ),  Kümüx (Kumishi, K'u-mi-shih;  / ), Kokjay (Ke'erjian, Köjey;  / , formerly Kujiayi ), Alehui,  Yilanlik (Yilahu, Yilanliq, I-la-hu;  / , formerly  / ), Shah (Xia;  /  , formerly  / ), Bostan (Bositan;  / , formerly  / )
	
Township ( / ):	
Gholbuyi Township (Guolebuyi;  / )

Economy 
Irrigation in the county is well-developed. Agricultural products of the county include sorghum, wheat, muskmelon, peanuts and cotton. Specialty products include Hami melon and raisins. Industries include electronics, coal, machinery, construction, etc.

Demographics

As of 2015, 96,439 of the 124,040 residents of Toksun County were Uyghur, 18,600 were Han Chinese, 8,539 were Hui and 462 were from other ethnic groups.

As of the 2000 Census, the county counted 52,346 males and 49,804 females and 83.65% of the population of the county were from ethnic minority groups.

As of 1999, 77.03% of the population of Toksun County were Uyghur and 15.51% of the population was Han Chinese.

Transportation
 China National Highway 312
 China National Highway 314
 Southern Xinjiang railway

Notable persons
 Tömür Dawamat

Historical maps 
Historical English-language maps including Toksun:

References

County-level divisions of Xinjiang
Turpan